Lycaena thetis, the golden copper, is a small butterfly found in Greece, Asia Minor - Armenia (highlands), Iraq, Iran, Baluchistan, Chitral and Ladak  that belongs to the lycaenids or blues family.

Description from Seitz

C. thetis Klug (= Ignitus H.-Schaff.) (76 c)
At once recognized by the black apex of the forewing of the male being continued along the costal margin for some distance and by the markings of the underside of the hindwing being almost entirely suppressed by light scaling. In the southern districts of the Balkan Peninsula, Asia Minor and Transcaucasia. — caudatus Stgr. (76 c, d, on the plate caudata) is a form (spring- brood?) with thin but rather long tail. — The name-typical form flies in July and is plentiful on flowering thyme, occasionally being found together with virgaureae.

See also
List of butterflies of India
List of butterflies of India (Lycaenidae)

References

 
  
 
 
 
 

Lycaena
Butterflies of Asia
Butterflies of Europe
Butterflies described in 1834
Taxa named by Johann Christoph Friedrich Klug